Saint Lucia competed at the 2019 World Athletics Championships in Doha, Qatar, from 27 September to 6 October 2019.

Results

Men 
Field events

Women 
Field events

References

Nations at the 2019 World Athletics Championships
World Championships in Athletics
Saint Lucia at the World Championships in Athletics